The 1938 Maine Black Bears football team was an American football team that represented the University of Maine as a member of the New England Conference during the 1938 college football season. In its 18th season under head coach Fred Brice, the team compiled a 3–4 record (2–1 against conference opponents).  The team played its home games at Alumni Field in Orono, Maine. Dana Drew was the team captain.

Schedule

References

Maine
Maine Black Bears football seasons
Maine Black Bears football